Hervé Pierre

 Hervé Pierre (actor) (born 1955), French actor and theatre director
 Hervé Pierre (designer) (born 1965), French-American fashion and costume designer